Varcharz is a studio album by German electronica duo Mouse on Mars. It was released by Ipecac Recordings in 2006. Contrasting with their previous album, Radical Connector, which had a poppier sound, Varcharz has a much more abrasive sound.

Critical reception
At Metacritic, which assigns a weighted average score out of 100 to reviews from mainstream critics, Varcharz received an average score of 71% based on 10 reviews, indicating "generally favorable reviews".

Heather Phares of AllMusic gave the album 4 stars out of 5, saying, "Varcharz shows that the duo is just as adamant about -- and adept at -- exploring the wilder fringes of their sound as they are honing it into forward-thinking pop."

Track listing

Personnel
Credits adapted from liner notes.

 Jan St. Werner – music, production
 Andi Toma – music, production

References

External links
 
 

2006 albums
Mouse on Mars albums
Ipecac Recordings albums